This is a list of 116 species in Glossosoma, a genus of little black caddisflies in the family Glossosomatidae.

Glossosoma species

 Glossosoma abhikhara Schmid, 1959 i c g
 Glossosoma abhisares Schmid, 1971 i c g
 Glossosoma aequale Banks, 1940 i c g
 Glossosoma agarenorum Schmid, 1959 i c g
 Glossosoma alascense Banks, 1900 i c g
 Glossosoma ali Mey, 1996 i c g
 Glossosoma altaicum (Martynov, 1914) i c g
 Glossosoma ambhi Schmid, 1959 i c g
 Glossosoma anakemei Malicky, 1995 i c g
 Glossosoma anakgunung Malicky, 1995 i c g
 Glossosoma anaktana Malicky, 1995 i c g
 Glossosoma anale Martynov, 1931 i c g
 Glossosoma angaricum (Levanidova, 1967) i c g
 Glossosoma atchintitam Schmid, 1971 i c g
 Glossosoma atestas Malicky & Chantaramongkol, 1992 i c g
 Glossosoma atitto Malicky & Chantaramongkol, 1992 i c g
 Glossosoma atreju Malicky, 1986 i c g
 Glossosoma atrichum Ross, 1956 i c g
 Glossosoma aveleta Ross & Hwang, 1953 i c g
 Glossosoma baclava Malicky, 1972 i c g
 Glossosoma bahukantakam Schmid, 1971 i c g
 Glossosoma balephiana Malicky, 1995 i c g
 Glossosoma beaumonti Schmid, 1947 i c g
 Glossosoma bifidum McLachlan, 1879 g
 Glossosoma boltoni Curtis, 1834 i c g
 Glossosoma bruna Denning, 1954 i c g
 Glossosoma bukitanum Malicky, 1978 i c g
 Glossosoma bunae Marinkovic, 1988 g
 Glossosoma burmanum Kimmins, 1953 i c g
 Glossosoma califica Denning, 1948 i c g
 Glossosoma capitatum Martynov, 1913 i c g
 Glossosoma caudatum Martynov, 1931 i c g
 Glossosoma confluens Kimmins, 1953 i c g
 Glossosoma conforme Neboiss, 1963 i c g
 Glossosoma conformis Neboiss, 1963 g
 Glossosoma dentatum McLachlan, 1875 i c g
 Glossosoma develi Malicky, 1972 i c g
 Glossosoma dirghakantakam Schmid, 1971 i c g
 Glossosoma discophorum Klapálek, 1902 i c g
 Glossosoma dulkejti (Martynov, 1934) i c g
 Glossosoma dusmeti Navas, 1920 i c g
 Glossosoma elvisso Malicky & Chantaramongkol, 1992 i c g
 Glossosoma excitum Ross, 1938 i c g
 Glossosoma furcatum Navás, 1932 i c g
 Glossosoma hazbanicum Botosaneanu in Botosaneanu & Gasith, 1971 i c g
 Glossosoma heliakreya Schmid, 1959 i c g
 Glossosoma hemantajam Schmid, 1971 i c g
 Glossosoma himalayanum (Martynov, 1930) i c g
 Glossosoma hissarica Ivanov, 1992 i c g
 Glossosoma hospitum (Tsuda, 1940) i c g
 Glossosoma idaho Ross, 1941 i c g
 Glossosoma inops (Tsuda, 1940) i c g
 Glossosoma intermedium (Klapalek, 1892) i c g
 Glossosoma japonicum Kobayashi, 1972 i c g
 Glossosoma javanicum Ulmer, 1930 i c g
 Glossosoma jentumar Malicky & Chantaramongkol, 1992 i c g
 Glossosoma kamarasikam Schmid, 1971 i c g
 Glossosoma kchinam Schmid, 1971 i c g
 Glossosoma kelleyi Ross, 1956 i c g
 Glossosoma kiritchenkoi (Martynov, 1927) i c g
 Glossosoma kirke Malicky, 2003 g
 Glossosoma kissottoi Malicky, 1997 i c g
 Glossosoma klotho Malicky, 2003 g
 Glossosoma krichnarunam Schmid, 1971 i c g
 Glossosoma lividum (Hagen, 1861) i c g
 Glossosoma mahasiah Malicky, 2014 g
 Glossosoma malayanum Banks, 1934 i c g
 Glossosoma melikertes Malicky, 2003 g
 Glossosoma mereca Denning, 1948 i c g
 Glossosoma minutum (Martynov, 1927) i c g
 Glossosoma montana Ross, 1941 i c g
 Glossosoma moselyi Kimmins, 1953 i c g
 Glossosoma neffi Arefina, 2000 i c g
 Glossosoma neretvae Marinkovic, 1988 g
 Glossosoma nichinkata Schmid, 1971 i c g
 Glossosoma nigrior Banks, 1911 i c g b
 Glossosoma nigroroseum Schmid, 1971 i c g
 Glossosoma nylanderi McLachlan, 1879 i c g
 Glossosoma oregonense Ling, 1938 i c g
 Glossosoma orientale Kimmins, 1953 i c g
 Glossosoma parvulum Banks, 1904 i c g
 Glossosoma penitus Banks, 1914 i c g
 Glossosoma persicum Jacquemart, 1965 i c g
 Glossosoma pinigisana Malicky, 1994 i c g
 Glossosoma privatum McLachlan, 1884 i c g
 Glossosoma pterna Ross, 1947 i c g
 Glossosoma pyroxum Ross, 1941 i c g
 Glossosoma sadoense Kobayashi, 1982 i c g
 Glossosoma schuhi Ross, 1947 i c g
 Glossosoma sellatum Ross & Hwang, 1953 i c g
 Glossosoma sequoia Denning, 1973 i c g
 Glossosoma shugnanica Ivanov, 1992 i c g
 Glossosoma sikkimense  g
 Glossosoma speculare Kobayashi, 1972 i c g
 Glossosoma spinatum Ruiter, 2000 i c g
 Glossosoma spoliatum McLachlan, 1879 i c g
 Glossosoma subaequale Schmid, 1971 i c g
 Glossosoma sumitaensis Kobayashi, 1982 i c g
 Glossosoma taeniatum Ross & Hwang, 1953 i c g
 Glossosoma taiwanensis  g
 Glossosoma timurense Martynov, 1927 i c g
 Glossosoma traviatum Banks, 1936 i c g
 Glossosoma tripartitum Schmid, 1971 i c g
 Glossosoma tunceliensis Sipahiler in Sipahiler & Malicky, 1987 i c g
 Glossosoma tunpuensis  g
 Glossosoma unguiculatum Martynov, 1925 i c g
 Glossosoma uogalanum Kobayashi, 1982 i c g
 Glossosoma ussuricum (Martynov, 1934) i c g
 Glossosoma valvatum Ulmer, 1926 i c g
 Glossosoma vaneyam Schmid, 1971 i c g
 Glossosoma varjakantakam Schmid, 1971 i c g
 Glossosoma velona Ross, 1938 i c g
 Glossosoma ventrale Banks, 1904 i c g
 Glossosoma verdonum Ross, 1938 i c g
 Glossosoma wenatchee Ross & Spencer, 1952 i c g
 Glossosoma yigilca Sipahiler, 1996 i c g

Data sources: i = ITIS, c = Catalogue of Life, g = GBIF, b = Bugguide.net

References

Glossosoma
Articles created by Qbugbot